Pueblo High School may refer to:

 Pueblo Catholic High School, Pueblo, Colorado,
 Pueblo County High School, Vineland, Colorado
 Pueblo High School (Tucson), Tucson, Arizona
 Pueblo West High School, Pueblo West, Colorado